Juka can refer to:

Juka, a nickname of Bosnian gangster and warlord Jusuf Prazina
Juka, the Japanese musician now known as Shaura
Juka (soup), a blood-based Lithuanian dish
Juka, an acrobatic aircraft manufactured by Jurgis Kairys